The Women's 10 metre air pistol singles event took place at 13 October 2010 at the CRPF Campus. There was a qualification round held to determine the final participants.

Results

External links
Report

Shooting at the 2010 Commonwealth Games
Comm